Werewolf Rising is a 2014 horror film written and directed by BC Furtney. The film was released to DVD in the United Kingdom on 22 September 2014 and was later released in the United States on 14 October. It stars Bill Oberst Jr. and Melissa Carnell, who portrays a young woman that finds herself the unwitting prey of a werewolf.

Synopsis

A car approaches a clearing at dusk. Inside, a woman has been taken hostage by a man named Rhett wielding a knife. He forces her out of the car and attempts to rape her but is interrupted by a monster. It attacks the pair, and while the woman is killed, a lacerated Rhett escapes, now cursed with the creature's bloodline.

Hoping to overcome her alcoholism by sequestering herself, Emma has traveled to the old family homestead maintained by her father's friend Wayne. Through a phone conversation, it is revealed that it has been twenty years since her last visit home and that she has been plagued with nightmares consisting of her lost in the woods for most of her life, with the addition of a man stalking her once she began her quest to sober up.

Once there, Emma goes through her father's old things and spends the evening watching old home videos. She drifts into sleep, and she begins to have several gruesome nightmares involving a bloodstained man stalking her through the woods. Emma wakes from her dream and heads to the fridge to calm herself. She finds two beers and proceeds to dump the alcohol but is interrupted by a man approaching her as she does so. He introduces himself as Johnny Lee, Wayne's nephew. At first, Emma is unsure of who he is but warms up to Johnny Lee's attempts to make idle conversation. They part ways, and it is revealed that Johnny Lee sleeps in a shack in the middle of the woods. Once there, a howling wolf is heard in the distance.

The following day Wayne visits Emma. Emma mentions Johnny Lee visited, and his tone changes. He reveals that Johnny Lee is an escaped convict with a history of violence and drug abuse. Wayne gives Emma a handgun for her protection and changes the locks. The two arrange to have dinner the following evening.

The next day, Emma proceeds to walk the woods and arrives at a small lake. Once there, Johnny Lee reveals himself by casting a rock in her direction. They spend the day traversing the wilderness on Emma's ATV, and Johnny Lee reveals his living conditions to Emma. He quickly teaches her how to handle the ATV once she turns down his offer to continue their evening. Emma offers her hospitality flirtatiously to Johnny Lee, and they decide to meet the following evening.

In the evening, alone in his shack, Johnny Lee hears a wolf's distant calls. Then there is a quick bang on his door, followed by a werewolf breaking down the door and attacking him. The creature takes down Johnny Lee, and in the struggle, he uses a large wooden splinter to defend himself.

Back at Emma's place, Wayne and Emma are eating dinner. While Emma seeks to maintain a friendly atmosphere with him, Wayne attempts to court Emma with flattery and flowers. As the night progresses, Wayne becomes intoxicated and tries to push Emma into a corner and initiate a sexual encounter. Emma refuses and forces Wayne to leave. She composes herself and heads to Johnny Lee's place. Once there, she finds his door in pieces and Johnny Lee with deep lacerations. Emma rushes him to her place for medical attention while the creature watches in the brush. She pleads with Johnny Lee to let her help him and professes that she knows everything about him and does not care but only wishes to be with him. Johnny Lee bleeds out on her kitchen floor. Emma, believing him dead, grieves on the front porch. The rustling of the brush near her porch and deep animal growls frighten her, and she runs inside in terror only to find Johnny Lee missing. Emma finds him in her bathroom and is surprised that he's still alive. She cleans his wounds and offers her help, but Johnny Lee refuses. He reveals to Emma that a large wolf attacked him.

The following day, Emma removes the bloodstains from her floors and tends to Johnny Lee. He recovers quickly and becomes increasingly hungry. That evening, his behavior changes, and he begins to pine for meat. She offers to make him soup, and she quickly fetches her handgun. Johnny Lee heads outside and becomes unruly, berating Emma's offers for soup and her insistence that he come inside. He runs through the woods and becomes animalistic; Emma finds him but becomes frightened by his guttural howls. Emma quickly runs home, composes herself, and attempts to look for Johnny Lee. She drives down the paths near the lake, searching for Johnny Lee, and finds no one. The creature arrives at her location, and Emma rushes home, where it begins to torment her inside the house by banging and scratching the windows. As she tries to leave for her vehicle, the creature reveals itself, and she is forced back inside the cabin. Across town, Wayne is drinking in the local bar explaining why he did what he did. Emma locks herself in the closet and stumbles upon a bottle of vodka, which she quickly chugs. She makes her way out into the living room and passes out. Wayne heads to the cabin in a drunken stupor to apologize to Emma. Meanwhile, a nude Johnny Lee walks into the local laundromat in another part of town, collects someone's clothes, and walks out.

Upon finding Emma in her living room, Wayne carries her to her bedroom and collects his handgun from her. Johnny Lee arrives to find Wayne stepping out of Emma's door and questions him about his reasoning for being there. Johnny Lee begins to taunt Wayne about his taste in younger women. Wayne defends himself by bringing up Johnny Lee's past and drug history. The confrontation escalates, and Wayne shoots him, alerting Emma to the situation. As she's attempting to help Johnny Lee, Wayne also shoots her.

Meanwhile, Johnny Lee begins to turn and aims to attack Wayne, but Wayne quickly guns him down. Behind him, Rhett makes his presence known. He reveals to Wayne that he was the other escaped convict with Johnny Lee and that Rhett is aware of who he is. Wayne shoots Rhett and attempts to strangle Emma as she begins to stir but is interrupted by the werewolf's appearance. The beast drags Wayne to the clearing and kills him while Emma crawls to safety. The beast then turns its attention to Emma, who is able to defend herself with a kitchen knife.

She runs from the cabin with the beast in hot pursuit, only to be tormented as it delights in chasing her. She stumbles upon a clearing with a woman in red, Beatrix, standing next to a campfire. She attempts to warn the woman of the creature, but she chastises her and reveals her name, that she has been writing to him for years while he was in prison and that the only reason he is here is that she led him there. The werewolf enters the clearing, and Beatrix disrobes for him, only for the wolf to kill her and grapple with Emma. As she screams, the creature shifts back to human form. Rhett knows about Emma's dream and tells her that he "knows" her but does not know her father. He tells her that she has something special inside her, like her father before her, and advises her to give in to it. As she writhes on the ground, Rhett tells her she has something beautiful inside her, and Emma begins to transform.

In a post-credit scene, Emma goes to a neighbor's home, pleading for help as she writhes in pain. An older woman approaches and asks if she can help. As the screen fades to black, Emma's face can be seen as she roars, going in for the kill.

Cast
 Melissa Carnell as Emma
 Brian Berry as Wayne Dobbs
 Matt Copko as Johnny Lee
 Taylor Horneman as Werewolf
 Danielle Lozeau as Christina
 Irena Murphy as Beatrix
 Bill Oberst Jr. as Rhett
 Julia Jacome
 Teagan Grinwis
 Jessie Lewis
 Myles Adkin

Reception
Critical reception for Werewolf Rising has been predominantly negative. Reviewers for Bloody Disgusting panned the film and both criticized the movie's special effects, while also agreeing that Oberst Jr. was the "only bright spot in the film". Starburst also criticized the film, negatively comparing the plot premise to Juan Martínez Moreno's 2012 film Game of Werewolves.

Ain't It Cool News praised Werewolf Rising and wrote that "while there are some trips along the way in terms of acting and effects, WEREWOLF RISING gets points for trying something new."

References

External links
 

2014 films
2014 horror films
American werewolf films
2010s English-language films
2010s American films